In Arizona, the Young Public School is the K-12 public school in the town of Young.

Public high schools in Arizona
Schools in Gila County, Arizona
Public elementary schools in Arizona
Public middle schools in Arizona